Leon is a town in Love County, Oklahoma, United States. The population was 91 at the 2010 census. It is part of the Ardmore Micropolitan Statistical Area.

Geography
Leon is located in western Love County at  (33.878618, -97.428710). Oklahoma State Highway 76 leads north from Leon  to State Highway 32.

Demographics

As of the census of 2000, there were 96 people, 34 households, and 24 families residing in the town. The population density was 363.6 people per square mile and roughly 551.8 animals per square mile (142.6/km2). There were 42 housing units at an average density of 159.1 per square mile (62.4/km2). The racial makeup of the town was 45.12% White, 12.50% Native American, 1.04% from other races, and 8.33% from two or more races. Hispanic or Latino of any race were 73.04% of the population.

There were 34 households, out of which 29.4% had children under the age of 18 living with them, 41.2% were married couples living together, 23.5% had a female householder with no husband prese, and 29.4% were non-families. 23.5% of all households were made up of individuals, and 11.8% had someone living alone who was 65 years of age or older. The average household size was 2.82 and the average family size was 4.46.

In the town, the population was spread out, with 34.4% under the age of 18, 9.4% from 18 to 24, 22.9% from 25 to 44, 17.7% from 45 to 64, and 15.6% who were 65 years of age or older. The median age was 35 years. For every 100 females, there were 104.3 males. For every 100 females age 18 and over, there were 80.0 males.

The median income for a household in the town was $10,500, and the median income for a family was $21,667. Males had a median income of $12,000 versus $17,500 for females. The per capita income for the town was $18,908. There were 12.5% of families and 11.1% of the population living below the poverty line, including  15 teenagers and none of those over 64.

Many local persons refer to Leon as where they live and are from even though they do not specifically reside within the city limits. The Census data does not now reflect this, as a result of the fact that many residences which were once covered by the Leon zip code were reassigned in a recent 911 address change.

Education
Most youth in Leon attend Turner Public Schools in Burneyville. Leon Public Schools was consolidated with Turner Public Schools in 1994.

Many people believe that the old Leon school is now haunted.

Businesses
Leon currently has no businesses and currently is considered a bedroom community, in that those who live there commute to their respective places of employment. Leon is a potential location for a convenience store/ restaurant, as well as a location for an industrial production plant, or distribution center. Utilities are electrical, from the Red River Valley Rural Electrical Association Cooperative, and water is from the Rural Water Department Number One. There is no natural gas service at this time, with property occupants utilizing electric heat, propane, butane, and wood. Sanitation consists of individual property septic systems. Waste disposal is the responsibility of the property occupant. There is a local refuse route disposal company.

Religion 
The majority of Leonites are Southern Baptist. The Leon Baptist Church, a member of the Enon Baptist Association, is the sole active church in the town.

References

Towns in Love County, Oklahoma
Towns in Oklahoma
Ardmore, Oklahoma micropolitan area